Stéphane Richelmi (born 17 March 1990 in Monte Carlo) is a professional racing driver from Monaco. He is the son of former World Rally Championship driver Jean-Pierre Richelmi.

Career

Formula Renault 1.6 & 2.0
Richelmi began his Formula racing career in the Belgian Formula Renault 1.6 category in 2006, ending the year in 12th place.

The following year, he stepped up to the Eurocup Formula Renault 2.0 series, racing for Boutsen Energy Racing. He finished the season with no points, with his best race result being an 18th place at the Hungaroring. He also contested two races of the Italian Formula Renault Championship.

In 2008, Richelmi participated in both the Eurocup and Formula Renault 2.0 West European Cup series. He failed to score a point in eight Eurocup races and left the series after failing to qualify for either race at the Le Mans meeting. He finished only 16th in the qualifying race for drivers who failed to make super pole, with the top twelve in the race qualifying for the weekend. In the West European Cup, he scored points in three of his seven races to finish 16th in the championship.

Formula Three
Richelmi made the step up to Formula Three in late 2008, taking part in the final six races of the Formula 3 Euro Series season with Barazi-Epsilon. His best result was an 18th place on his début in Barcelona.

The following year, Richelmi and the team entered the British Formula 3 Championship, running a Dallara F308 chassis in the International Class. Despite not finishing in the points in any of his 15 races, he was awarded two points at both Spa-Francorchamps and Portimão due to a number of cars finishing ahead of him who were ineligible for championship points. He was classified 19th in the final standings.

During the year, Richelmi also took part in the Italian Formula Three Championship, driving for RC Motorsport. Despite missing the first two rounds at Adria and Magione, he finished sixth in the standings, scoring podium places at Varano, Imola and Vallelunga. Richelmi continued in the Italian Formula Three series in 2010, switching to the Lucidi Motors team. He finished the season as runner-up behind BVM-Target Racing's César Ramos, taking four race victories and eight podium places in total. Along with Ramos and Andrea Caldarelli, Richelmi tested a Ferrari F2008 Formula One car as a prize for finishing in the top three in the championship, with the test taking place at Vallelunga on Thursday 2 December. He completed 25 laps during the test and was the slowest of the three runners with a time of 1:17.97.

Formula Renault 3.5 Series
In October 2009, Richelmi tested a Formula Renault 3.5 Series car for the first time, taking part in the first post-season test session at Motorland Aragón with the recently crowned champions Draco Racing. He completed a total of 80 laps, recording a best time of 1:44.526 on the second day of running. A year later he tested again for Draco at Barcelona and Motorland Aragón and also had an outing with French team Tech 1 Racing at the latter venue.

It was announced in January 2011 that Richelmi would join the series for the 2011 season, racing for International DracoRacing alongside fellow newcomer André Negrão.

Sports cars

In October 2009, Richelmi took part in the French FFSA GT Championship round at Paul Ricard, supporting the FIA GT race held on the same weekend. Sharing a Chevrolet Corvette C6.R with Éric Cayrolle, he finished second in the first race before winning the second event.

GP2 Series

Richelmi made his GP2 Series début in the 2011 season finale at Monza, replacing his injured compatriot Stefano Coletti at the Trident Racing team. His team-mate was Rodolfo González. Despite not having tested the car before the event, he finished both races ahead of González. He remained with Trident for the 2012 season, alongside Julián Leal. Taking a best result of third place in the feature race at Hockenheim by gambling successfully on tyre choice in changing weather conditions, he finished 18th in the championship. For 2013, he moved to reigning teams champion DAMS alongside Marcus Ericsson, he managed to score a podium finish at Silverstone and finished 8th in the standings on 103 points.

Richelmi continued with DAMS for the 2014 season, this time with champion of that season Jolyon Palmer. Richelmi scored his maiden GP2 victory in the sprint race at his home event in Monaco and another podium in the sprint race at Italy ensured he finished 9th in the championship on 73 points which helped DAMS take the teams championship.

Racing record

Career summary

† As Richelmi was a guest driver, he was ineligible for championship points.

Complete Formula 3 Euro Series results
key) (Races in bold indicate pole position) (Races in italics indicate fastest lap)

† Driver did not finish the race, but was classified as he completed over 90% of the race distance.
‡ As Richelmi was a guest driver, he was ineligible for championship points.

Complete Formula Renault 3.5 Series results
(key) (Races in bold indicate pole position) (Races in italics indicate fastest lap)

Complete GP2 Series results
(key) (Races in bold indicate pole position) (Races in italics indicate fastest lap)

† Driver did not finish the race, but was classified as he completed over 90% of the race distance.

Complete GP2 Final results
(key) (Races in bold indicate pole position) (Races in italics indicate fastest lap)

Complete GT World Challenge Europe Sprint Cup results

Complete FIA World Endurance Championship results

24 Hours of Le Mans results

References

External links
  
 

1990 births
Living people
People from Monte Carlo
Monegasque racing drivers
British Formula Three Championship drivers
Italian Formula Three Championship drivers
Formula 3 Euro Series drivers
Formula Renault Eurocup drivers
Formula Renault 2.0 WEC drivers
Italian Formula Renault 2.0 drivers
Belgian Formula Renault 1.6 drivers
World Series Formula V8 3.5 drivers
GP2 Series drivers
Blancpain Endurance Series drivers
24 Hours of Le Mans drivers
24 Hours of Spa drivers
FIA World Endurance Championship drivers
Epsilon Euskadi drivers
RC Motorsport drivers
Draco Racing drivers
Trident Racing drivers
DAMS drivers
W Racing Team drivers
Signature Team drivers
Jota Sport drivers
Audi Sport drivers
Boutsen Ginion Racing drivers
Le Mans Cup drivers